In theoretical physics, a supermultiplet is a representation of a supersymmetry algebra.

Then a superfield is a field on superspace which is valued in such a representation. Naïvely, or when considering flat superspace, a superfield can simply be viewed as a function on superspace. Formally, it is a section of an associated supermultiplet bundle.

Phenomenologically, superfields are used to describe particles. It is a feature of supersymmetric field theories that particles form pairs, called superpartners where bosons are paired with fermions.

These supersymmetric fields are used to build supersymmetric quantum field theories, where the fields are promoted to operators.

History
Superfields were introduced by Abdus Salam and J. A. Strathdee in their 1974 article Supergauge Transformations.  Operations on superfields and a partial classification were presented a few months later by Sergio Ferrara, Julius Wess and Bruno Zumino in Supergauge Multiplets and Superfields.

Naming and classification
The most commonly used supermultiplets are vector multiplets, chiral multiplets (in 4D N=1 supersymmetry for example), hypermultiplets (in 4D N=2 supersymmetry for example), tensor multiplets and gravity multiplets.  The highest component of a vector multiplet is a gauge boson, the highest component of a chiral or hypermultiplet is a spinor, the highest component of a gravity multiplet is a graviton.  The names are defined so as to be invariant under dimensional reduction, although the organization of the fields as representations of the Lorentz group changes.

The use of these names for the different multiplets can vary in literature. A chiral multiplet (whose highest component is a spinor) may sometimes be referred to as a scalar multiplet, and in N=2 SUSY, a vector multiplet (whose highest component is a vector) can sometimes be referred to as a chiral multiplet.

Superfield in d = 4, N = 1 supersymmetry 

A general complex superfield  in  supersymmetry can be expanded as

,

where  are different complex fields. This is not an irreducible supermultiplet, and so different constraints are needed to isolate irreducible representations.

Chiral superfield 
A (anti-)chiral superfield is a supermultiplet of  supersymmetry.

In four dimensions, the minimal  supersymmetry may be written using the notion of superspace.

In N=1 supersymmetry in 3+1D, a chiral superfield is a function over chiral superspace. There exists a projection from the (full) superspace to chiral superspace. So, a function over chiral
superspace can be pulled back to the full superspace. Such a function  satisfies the covariant constraint , where  is the covariant derivative, given in index notation as

A chiral superfield  can then be expanded as

where . The superfield is independent of the 'conjugate spin coordinates'  in the sense that it depends on  only through . It can be checked that 

The expansion has the interpretation that  is a complex scalar field,  is a Weyl spinor. There is also the auxiliary complex scalar field , named  by convention: this is the F-term which plays an important role in some theories.

The field can then be expressed in terms of the original coordinates  by substituting the expression for :

Antichiral superfields 

Similarly, there is also antichiral superspace, which is the complex conjugate of chiral superspace, and antichiral superfields.

An antichiral superfield  satisfies  where

An antichiral superfield can be constructed as the complex conjugate of a chiral superfield.

Actions from chiral superfields 
For an action which can be defined from a single chiral superfield, see Wess-Zumino model.

Vector superfield
The vector superfield is a supermultiplet of  supersymmetry.

A vector superfield (also known as a real superfield) is a function  which satisfies the reality condition . Such a field admits the expansion

The constituent fields are
 Two real scalar fields  and 
 A complex scalar field 
 Two Weyl spinor fields  and 
 A real vector field (gauge field) 

Their transformation properties and uses are further discussed in supersymmetric gauge theory.

Using gauge transformations, the fields  and  can be set to zero. This is known as Wess-Zumino gauge. In this gauge, the expansion takes on the much simpler form

It is conventionally called , and is known as the D-term.

Scalars
A scalar is never the highest component of a superfield; whether it appears in a superfield at all depends on the dimension of the spacetime. For example, in a 10-dimensional N=1 theory the vector multiplet contains only a vector and a Majorana–Weyl spinor, while its dimensional reduction on a d-dimensional torus is a vector multiplet containing d real scalars.  Similarly, in an 11-dimensional theory there is only one supermultiplet with a finite number of fields, the gravity multiplet, and it contains no scalars.  However again its dimensional reduction on a d-torus to a maximal gravity multiplet does contain scalars.

Hypermultiplet

A hypermultiplet is a type of representation of an extended supersymmetry algebra, in particular the matter multiplet of N=2 supersymmetry in 4 dimensions, containing two complex scalars Ai, a Dirac spinor ψ, and two further auxiliary complex scalars Fi.

See also

 Supersymmetric gauge theory
 D-term
 F-term

References

 Stephen P. Martin. A Supersymmetry Primer, arXiv:hep-ph/9709356 .
 Yuji Tachikawa. N=2 supersymmetric dynamics for pedestrians, arXiv:1312.2684.
 

Supersymmetry